Brian De Garis is a Western Australian historian. He edited a number of important texts about Western Australian history. His Masters thesis was about Sir Hal Colebatch. His doctoral thesis entitled British influence on the federation of the Australian colonies, 1880-1901 was completed at Oxford University. He taught and was involved in administration at University of Western Australia, and Murdoch University.

Publications

Notes

Alumni of Wadham College, Oxford
Australian Rhodes Scholars
Historians from Western Australia
Living people
People educated at Perth Modern School
University of Western Australia alumni
Year of birth missing (living people)